"It's a Hap-Hap-Happy Day" is a popular song with words by Sammy Timberg & Winston Sharples and music by Al J. Neiburg.  It was featured in the animated feature film Gulliver's Travels in 1939.  It was a hit in the UK in 1940 during the Battle of Britain, having been played heavily on the BBC radio.

Notable recordings
 Bob Zurke & His Delta Rhythm Band
Arthur Askey
Guy Lombardo and His Royal Canadians
Judy Garland

References

1939 songs
Songs written for animated films